This is an index to the amphibians found in India. The amphibians of India show a high level of endemism. This list is based largely on Darrel Frost (2006) and includes common names from older books and journals.

Order Anura

Family Bufonidae
 Ornate torrent toad, Ansonia ornata = Ghatophryne ornata (Günther, 1876)
 Silent Valley torrent toad, Ansonia ornata = Ghatophryne rubigina (Pillai and Pattabiraman, 1981)
 Bufo beddomii (Günther, 1876)
 Bufo brevirostris (Rao, 1937)
 Bufo burmanus (Andersson, 1939)
 Duttaphrynus cyphosus = Bufo cyphosus (Ye, 1977)
 Himalayan toad, Duttaphrynus himalayanus (Günther, 1864) = Bufo himalayanus (Günther, 1864)
 Bufo hololius (Günther, 1876)
 Xanthophryne koynayensis (Soman, 1963)
 Xanthophryne tigerina Biju, Bocxlaer, Giri, Loader and Bossuyt, 2009
 Ladakh toad, Pseudepidalea latastii Boulenger, 1882 = Bufo latastii
 Common Indian toad, Duttaphrynus melanostictus (Schneider, 1799) = Bufo melanostictus Schneider, 1799 
 Duttaphrynus microtympanum (Boulenger, 1882) = Bufo microtympanum (Boulenger, 1882)
 Ingerophrynus macrotis (Boulenger, 1887)
 Bufo parietalis (Boulenger, 1882)
 Ferguson's toad, Bufo scaber (Schneider, 1799)
 Bufo silentvalleyensis (Pillai, 1981)
 Bufo stomaticus (Lütken, 1864)
 Green toad, Bufo viridis
 Bufo stuarti (Smith, 1929)
 Bufoides meghalayanus (Yazdani and Chanda, 1971)
 Pedostibes kempi (Boulenger, 1919)
 Pedostibes tuberculosus (Günther, 1876)

Family Dicroglossidae

Dicroglossinae
 Common skittering frog, Euphlyctis cyanophlyctis (Schneider, 1799)
 Euphlyctis ghoshi (Chanda, 1991)
 Indian five-fingered frog, Euphlyctis hexadactylus (Lesson, 1834)
 Karavali skittering frog, Euphlyctis karaavali Priti et al., 2016
 Fejervarya andamanensis (Stoliczka, 1870) = Limnonectes andamanensis (Stoliczka, 1870)
 Fejervarya assimilis (Blyth, 1852) 
 Fejervarya brama (Lesson, 1834) 
 Fejervarya brevipalmata (Peters, 1871) 
 Fejervarya cancrivora (Gravenhorst, 1829) 
 Fejervarya greenii (Boulenger, 1905) 
 Fejervarya keralensis (Dubois, 1981) 
 Alpine cricket frog, Fejervarya limnocharis (Gravenhorst, 1829) 
 Fejervarya murthii (Pillai, 1979) 
 Fejervarya mysorensis (Rao, 1922) 
 Fejervarya nicobariensis (Stoliczka, 1870) 
 Fejervarya nepalensis (Iskandar, 1998) 
 Fejervarya nilagirica (Jerdon, 1854) 
 Fejervarya orissaensis (Dutta, 1997) 
 Fejervarya parambikulamana (Rao, 1937) 
 Fejervarya rufescens (Jerdon, 1854) 
 Fejervarya sauriceps (Rao, 1937) 
 Fejervarya syhadrensis = Limnonectes syhadrensis (Annandale, 1919) 
 Fejervarya teraiensis (Dubois, 1984) 
 Jerdon's bullfrog, Hoplobatrachus crassus (Jerdon, 1854) 
 Indian bullfrog, Hoplobatrachus tigerinus (Daudin, 1802) 
 Limnonectes doriae (Boulenger, 1887) 
 Limnonectes hascheanus (Stoliczka, 1870) 
 Limnonectes khasianus (Anderson, 1871) 
 Limnonectes kuhlii (Tschudi, 1838) 
 Limnonectes laticeps (Boulenger, 1882) 
 Limnonectes limborgi (Sclater, 1892) 
 Limnonectes mawlyndipi (Chanda, 1990) 
 Limnonectes mawphlangensis (Pillai and Chanda, 1977) 
 Limnonectes shompenorum (Das, 1996)
 Minervarya charlesdarwini (Das, 1998) = Rana charlesdarwini
 Minervarya sahyadris (Dubois, Ohler, and Biju, 2001)
 Nanorana annandalii = Paa annandalii (Boulenger, 1920) 
 Nanorana arnoldi = Paa arnoldi (Dubois, 1975) 
 Nanorana barmoachensis = Paa barmoachensis (Khan and Tasnim, 1989)
 Nanorana blanfordii = Paa blanfordii (Boulenger, 1882)
 Nanorana conaensis = Paa conaensis (Fei and Huang In Huang and Fei, 1981)
 Nanorana ercepeae = Paa ercepeae (Dubois, 1974)
 Hazara torrent frog, Nanorana hazarensis = Paa hazarensis (Dubois and Khan, 1979)
 Nanorana liebigii = Paa liebigii (Günther, 1860)
 Nanorana minica = Paa minica (Dubois, 1975)
 Nanorana mokokchungensis = Paa mokokchungensis (Das and Chanda, 2000)
 Nanorana polunini = Paa polunini (Smith, 1951)
 Nanorana pleskei (Günther, 1896)
 Karez frog, Nanorana sternosignata = Paa sternosignata (Murray, 1885)
 Murree Hills frog, Nanorana vicina = Paa vicina (Stoliczka, 1872)
 Ombrana sikimensis = Chaparana sikimensis (Jerdon, 1870)
 Burrowing frog, Sphaerotheca breviceps (Schneider, 1799)
 Sphaerotheca dobsoni (Boulenger, 1882) 
 Sphaerotheca leucorhynchus (Rao, 1937) 
 Marbled sand frog Sphaerotheca rolandae (Dubois, 1983)

Occidozyginae
 Occidozyga borealis (Annandale, 1912) 
 Occidozyga lima (Gravenhorst, 1829) 
 Occidozyga sumatrana (Peters, 1877)

Family Hylidae
 Hyla annectans (Jerdon, 1870)

Family Megophryidae
 Hasselt's toad, Leptobrachium hasseltii (Tschudi, 1838)
 Leptobrachium smithi (Matsui, Nabhitabhata, and Panha, 1999)
 Scutiger boulengeri (Bedriaga, 1898)
 Scutiger gongshanensis (Yang and Su In Yang, Su, and Li, 1979)
 Nyingchi alpine toad, Scutiger nyingchiensis (Fei, 1977)
 Sikkim alpine toad, Scutiger sikimmensis (Blyth, 1855)
 Xenophrys boettgeri (Boulenger, 1899)
 Xenophrys kempii (Annandale, 1912)
 Xenophrys major (Boulenger, 1908)
 Xenophrys parva (Boulenger, 1893)
 Xenophrys robusta (Boulenger, 1908)
 Xenophrys wuliangshanensis

Family Micrixalidae
 Micrixalus elegans (Rao, 1937) 
 Micrixalus fuscus (Boulenger, 1882) 
 Micrixalus gadgili Pillai and Pattabiraman, 1990 
 Micrixalus kottigeharensis (Rao, 1937) 
 Micrixalus narainensis (Rao, 1937) 
 Micrixalus nudis Pillai, 1978 
 Micrixalus phyllophilus (Jerdon, 1854) 
 Micrixalus saxicola (Jerdon, 1854) 
 Micrixalus silvaticus (Boulenger, 1882) 
 Micrixalus swamianus (Rao, 1937) 
 Micrixalus thampii (Pillai, 1981)

Family Microhylidae
 Kalophrynus interlineatus (Blyth, 1855) = Kalophrynus orangensis (Dutta, Ahmed, and Das, 2000)
 Micryletta inornata (Boulenger, 1890)
 Ramanella anamalaiensis (Rao, 1937)
 Ramanella minor (Rao, 1937)
 Ramanella montana (Jerdon, 1854)
 Ramanella mormorata (Rao, 1937)
 Ramanella triangularis (Günther, 1876)
 White-bellied pug-snout frog, Ramanella variegata (Stoliczka, 1872)
 Uperodon globulosus (Günther, 1864)
 Marbled balloon frog, Uperodon systoma (Schneider, 1799)
 Melanobatrachus indicus (Beddome, 1878)
 Kaloula baleata (Müller In Oort and Müller, 1833)
 Painted frog, Kaloula pulchra (Gray, 1831) 
 Kaloula assamensis (Das, Sengupta, Ahmed, and Dutta, 2005)
 Sri Lankan bullfrog, Kaloula taprobanica (Parker, 1934)
 Microhyla berdmorei (Blyth, 1856)
 Microhyla chakrapanii (Pillai, 1977)
 Microhyla heymonsi (Vogt, 1911)
 Ornate narrow-mouthed toad, Microhyla ornata (Duméril and Bibron, 1841)
 Microhyla pulchra (Hallowell, 1861)
 Microhyla rubra (Jerdon, 1854)
 Microhyla sholigari (Dutta and Ray, 2000)
 Microhyla laterite Seshadri et al., 2016
 Mysticellus franki Garg & Biju, 2019

Family Nyctibatrachidae
 Nyctibatrachus aliciae (Inger, Shaffer, Koshy, and Bakde, 1984)
 Nyctibatrachus beddomii (Boulenger, 1882)
 Nyctibatrachus deccanensis (Dubois, 1984)
 Nyctibatrachus humayuni (Bhaduri and Kripalani, 1955)
 Nyctibatrachus hussaini (Krishnamurthy, Reddy, and Gururaja, 2001)
 Nyctibatrachus kempholeyensis (Rao, 1937)
 Nyctibatrachus major (Boulenger, 1882)
 Nyctibatrachus minor (Inger, Shaffer, Koshy, and Bakde, 1984)

 Nyctibatrachus periyar Biju et al., 2011
 Nyctibatrachus petraeus (Das and Kunte, 2005)
 Nyctibatrachus sanctipalustris (Rao, 1920)
 Nyctibatrachus sylvaticus (Rao, 1937)
 Nyctibatrachus vasanthi (Ravichandran, 1997)
 Nyctibatrachus minimus Biju et al., 2007.
 Nyctibatrachus sholai Radhakrishnan, Dinesh & Ravichandran, 2007.
 Nyctibatrachus dattatreyaensis Dinesh K P, Radhakrishnan C & Gopalakrishna Bhatta, 2008

Family Petropedetidae
 Indirana beddomii (Günther, 1876)
 Indirana brachytarsus (Günther, 1876)
 Indirana diplosticta (Günther, 1876)
 Indirana gundia (Dubois, 1986)
 Indirana leithii (Boulenger, 1888)
 Indirana leptodactyla (Boulenger, 1882)
 Indirana longicrus (Rao, 1937)
 Indirana phrynoderma (Boulenger, 1882)
 Indirana semipalmata (Boulenger, 1882)
 Indirana tenuilingua (Rao, 1937)

Family Ranidae
 Amolops chakrataensis (Ray, 1992)
 Amolops formosus (Günther, 1876) 
 Amolops gerbillus (Annandale, 1912) 
 Amolops himalayanus (Boulenger, 1888) 
 Amolops jaunsari (Ray, 1992)
 Amolops marmoratus (Blyth, 1855) 
 Amolops monticola (Anderson, 1871) 
 Amolops viridimaculatus (Jiang, 1983) 
 Bicolored frog, Clinotarsus curtipes (Jerdon, 1854) 
 Huia chloronota (Günther, 1876) 
 Humerana humeralis (Boulenger, 1887)
 Fungoid frog, Hydrophylax malabaricus (Tschudi, 1838)  
 Hydrophylax bahuvistara
 Hydrophylax raniceps (Peters, 1871) 
 Pterorana khare (Kiyasetuo and Khare, 1986) 
 Hylarana tytleri (Theobald, 1868) 
 Nasirana alticola (Boulenger, 1882) 
 Golden frog, Hylarana aurantiaca (Boulenger, 1904) 
 Hylarana chitwanensis (Das, 1998) 
 Boulenger's Garo hill frog, Hylarana garoensis (Boulenger, 1920 ) 
 Hylarana leptoglossa (Cope, 1868) 
 Hylarana nigrovittata (Blyth, 1856) 
 Bronzed frog, Hylarana temporalis (Günther, 1864)

Family Rhacophoridae
 Chiromantis cherrapunjiae = Chirixalus cherrapunjiae (Roonwal and Kripalani, 1966) 
 Chiromantis doriae = Chirixalus doriae (Boulenger, 1893) 
 Chiromantis dudhwaensis = Chirixalus dudhwaensis (Ray, 1992) 
 Chiromantis shyamrupus = Chirixalus shyamrupus (Chanda and Ghosh, 1989) 
 Chiromantis simus = Chirixalus simus (Annandale, 1915) 
 Chiromantis vittatus = Chirixalus vittatus (Boulenger, 1887) 
 Ghatixalus variabilis (Jerdon, 1853)
 Nyctixalus moloch (Annandale, 1912) 
 Kurixalus verrucosus = Rhacophorus verrucosus (Boulenger, 1893)
 Aquixalus bisacculus = Rhacophorus bisacculus (Taylor, 1962)
 Aquixalus naso = Polypedates naso (Annandale, 1912)
 Raorchestes andersoni (Ahl, 1927)
 Raorchestes anili (Biju and Bossuyt, 2006)
 Raorchestes luteolus (Kuramoto and Joshy, 2003) 
 Raorchestes tuberohumerus (Kuramoto and Joshy, 2003)
 Raorchestes annandalii (Boulenger, 1906) 
 Raorchestes beddomii (Günther, 1876) 
 Raorchestes bobingeri (Biju and Bossuyt, 2005) 
 Raorchestes bombayensis (Annandale, 1919)
 Raorchestes chalazodes (Günther, 1876) 
 Raorchestes charius (Rao, 1937) 
 Raorchestes dubius (Boulenger, 1882) 
 Raorchestes femoralis Round-snout pygmy frog (Günther, 1864) 
 Raorchestes flaviventris (Boulenger, 1882) 
 Raorchestes garo (Boulenger, 1919) 
 Raorchestes glandulosus (Jerdon, 1854) 
 Raorchestes graminirupes (Biju & Bossuyt, 2005) 
 Raorchestes griet (Bossuyt, 2002) 
 Raorchestes jerdonii (Günther, 1876) 
 Raorchestes kempiae (Boulenger, 1919) 
 Raorchestes luteolus = Raorchestes neelanethrus Gururaja et al., 2007
 Raorchestes microdiscus (Annandale, 1912) 
 Raorchestes namdaphaensis (Sarkar and Sanyal, 1985) 
 Sharp-snout pygmy tree frog, Raorchestes nasutus
 Raorchestes nerostagona 
 Raorchestes ochlandrae Gururaja et al., 2007.
 Raorchestes ponmudi 
 Raorchestes sanctisilvaticus (Das and Chanda, 1997) 
 Raorchestes shillongensis (Pillai and Chanda, 1973) 
 Raorchestes signatus (Boulenger, 1882) 
 Raorchestes similipalensis (Dutta, 2003) 
 Raorchestes terebrans (Das and Chanda, 1998) 
 Raorchestes tinniens (Jerdon, 1854) 
 Raorchestes travancoricus (Boulenger, 1891)
 Raorchestes tuberohumerus
 Raorchestes wynaadensis (Jerdon, 1854)
 Polypedates bengalensis Purkayastha et al., 2019
 Polypedates gongshanensis 
 Polypedates insularis (Das, 1995) 
 Polypedates leucomystax (Gravenhorst, 1829) 
 Polypedates maculatus (Gray, 1833) chunam frog
 Polypedates megacephalus (Hallowell, 1861) 
 Polypedates pseudocruciger (Das and Ravichandran, 1998) 
 Polypedates taeniatus (Boulenger, 1906) 
 Rhacophorus appendiculatus (Günther, 1858) 
 Rhacophorus bipunctatus (Ahl, 1927) 
 Rhacophorus calcadensis (Ahl, 1927) 
 Rhacophorus lateralis (Boulenger, 1883) 
 Malabar flying frog, Rhacophorus malabaricus (Jerdon, 1870) 
 Rhacophorus maximus (Günther, 1858)
 Rhacophorus namdaphaensis (Sarkar and Sanyal, 1985)
 Rhacophorus pseudomalabaricus (Vasudevan and Dutta, 2000)
 Rhacophorus tuberculatus (Anderson, 1871)
 Rhacophorus variabilis (Jerdon, 1854)
 Rhacophorus htunwini (Wilkinson, Thin, Lwin, and Shein, 2005)
 Rhacophorus translineatus (Wu In Sichuan Institute of Biology Herpetology Department, 1977)
 Rhacophorus kio (Ohler and Delorme, 2006)
 Theloderma asperum (Boulenger, 1886)

Family Sooglossidae
 Purple frog, Nasikabatrachus sahyadrensis (Biju and Bossuyt, 2003)
 Bhupathy's purple frog, Nasikabatrachus bupathi (Janani, Vasudevan, Prendini, Dutta, and Aggarwal, 2017)

Order Gymnophiona
The list of Indian caecilians is based on Giri & Gaikwad (2013) (duly amended):

Family Caeciliidae
Gegeneophis spp.
 Gegeneophis carnosus (Beddome, 1870)
 Amboli caecilian, Gegeneophis danieli Giri, Gower and Wilkinson 2003
 Gegeneophis goaensis Bhatta, Dinesh, Prashanth & Kulkarni, 2007
 Gegeneophis krishni Pillai and Ravichandran, 1999
 Gegeneophis madhavai Bhatta and Srinivasa, 2004
 Gegeneophis mhadeiensis Bhatta, Dinesh, Prashanth & Kulkarni, 2007
 Gegeneophis nadkarnii Bhatta and Prashanth, 2004
 Gegeneophis pareshi Giri, Gower, Gaikwad & Wilkinson, 2011 
 Gegeneophis primus Kotharambath, Gower, Oomen & Wilkinson, 2012
 Forest caecilian, Gegeneophis ramaswamii Taylor, 1964
 Gegeneophis seshachari Ravichandran, Gower, and Wilkinson, 2003

Indotyphlus spp.
 Indotyphlus battersbyi Taylor, 1960
 Maharashtra caecilian, Indotyphlus maharashtraensis Giri, Wilkinson, and Gower, 2003

Family Chikilidae
 Fuller's caecilian, Chikila fulleri (Alcock, 1904) formerly Gegeneophis fulleri
 Chikila alcocki Kamei, Gower, Wilkinson & Biju, 2013
 Chikila darlong Kamei, Gower, Wilkinson & Biju, 2013 
 Chikila gaiduwani Kamei, Gower, Wilkinson & Biju, 2013

Family Ichthyophiidae

Ichthyophis spp.

 Ichthyophis alfredii Mathew & Sen, 2009
 Ichthyophis beddomei Peters, 1880
 Ichthyophis bombayensis Taylor, 1960
 Ichthyophis daribokensis Mathew & Sen 2009 
 Ichthyophis garoensis Pillai and Ravichandran, 1999
 Ichthyophis davidi Bhatta, Dinesh, Kulkarni, Radhakrishnan 2011 

 Ichthyophis husaini Pillai and Ravichandran, 1999
 Ichthyophis kodaguensis Wilkinson, Gower, Govindappa & Venkatachalaiah, 2007
 Ichthyophis khumhzi Kamei, Wilkinson, Gower & Biju, 2009
 Ichthyophis longicephalus Pillai, 1986
 Ichthyophis moustakius Kamei, Wilkinson, Gower & Biju, 2009
 Ichthyophis nokrekensis Mathew & Sen, 2009
 Ichthyophis sendenyu Kamei, Wilkinson, Gower & Biju, 2009
 Ichthyophis sikkimensis Taylor, 1960
 Ichthyophis tricolor Annandale, 1909

Uraeotyphlus spp.
 Uraeotyphlus gansi Gower, Rajendran, Nussbaum, & Wilkinson, 2008
 Uraeotyphlus interruptus Pillai and Ravichandran, 1999
 Uraeotyphlus malabaricus (Beddome, 1870)
 Uraeotyphlus menoni Annandale, 1913
 Uraeotyphlus narayani Seshachar, 1939
 Uraeotyphlus oommeni Gower & Wilkinson, 2007
 Uraeotyphlus oxyurus (Duméril and Bibron, 1841)

Order Urodela

Family Salamandridae
 Himalayan newt, Tylototriton verrucosus (Anderson, 1871)

References

External links
 Global Amphibian Assessment
 AmphibiaWeb
 Amphibians of the Western Ghats

Amphibians
India
India